Valforêt is a commune in the eastern French department of Côte-d'Or. It was established on 1 January 2019 by merger of the former communes of Clémencey (the seat) and Quemigny-Poisot.

See also
Communes of the Côte-d'Or department

References

Communes of Côte-d'Or
Populated places established in 2019
2019 establishments in France